Balázs Bekő (born 15 December 1971) is a Hungarian football manager and former player who manages Soproni VSE.

Managerial career
On 24 June 2013, Bekő became the head coach of the Nemzeti Bajnokság I club Kecskeméti TE.

Bekő became the head coach of the Nemzeti Bajnokság I club Diósgyőri VTK in the summer of 2015.

References

Sources
Diósgyőri VTK official website 

1971 births
Living people
Footballers from Budapest
Association football midfielders
Hungarian footballers
Fehérvár FC players
Ferencvárosi TC footballers
Vasas SC players
Hungarian football managers
Fehérvár FC managers
Budaörsi SC managers
Kecskeméti TE managers
Diósgyőri VTK managers
Győri ETO FC managers
Soproni VSE managers
Balmazújvárosi FC managers
Nemzeti Bajnokság I managers
21st-century Hungarian people